Otherspace is the third and final book in the Truesight trilogy, following Truesight and The Seer. It is a young adult science fiction novel by American author David Stahler Jr.

Plot summary
The story begins with Xander and Jacob hunting gruskers, a strange plant-eating creature. Later, Jacob reveals that he wants to go to Teiresias in hopes of meeting the other escaped Seers. Delaney sells her eyes to buy his passage aboard the Odessa, commanded by Captain Bennet. Jacob becomes acquainted with the crew, but is wary of Folgrin, a businessman with strange eyes who seems suspicious. Aboard the ship, they go into Otherspace, a place encountered by entering a wormhole, and Jacob discovers that he is able to move during Otherspace, while others are rendered immobile.

When the ship crashes on Maker's Drift, a dark, neglected planet surrounded in superstition, only Bennet, Folgrin, and Jacob survive. After Jacob meets a strange couple, he and Bennet buy passage aboard a passenger liner to Teiresias, a strange planet where one half of the planet receives sunlight and the other is dark, cold, and barren. At Teiresias, Jacob eventually meets Avery, another Blinder who received vision. Jacob is taken to a base on the dark side of Teiresias where he meets the other Blinders who received sight and escaped.

2008 American novels
American young adult novels
American science fiction novels
2008 science fiction novels
Children's science fiction novels
Eos Books books